is a Japanese actor and voice actor from Kanagawa Prefecture. He is affiliated with Bungakuza.

Filmography

Film
Black Rain (1989) (Yūichi Okazakiya)

Television drama
Taiyō ni Hoero! (1986) (Shinya Itō)
Abarenbō Shōgun V (1993)
Tokusou Robo Janperson (1993) (Detective Sekichō)
Yoshitsune (2005) (Igara)
Kaze no Hate (2007)

Television animation
Ghost in the Shell: Stand Alone Complex - Solid State Society (2006) (Jin Munei)
Naruto (2006) (Unkai)
Ghost Hunt (2007) (Taizō Yoshimi)
Stitch! ~The Mischievous Alien's Great Adventure~ (2009) (Captain Rock)
Blast of Tempest (2012) (Utsui)
Yu-Gi-Oh! Zexal (2012) (Chukichi)

Video games
Crash Bandicoot: Warped (1998) (Dingodile)
Crash Team Racing (1999) (Dingodile)
Crash Bash (2000) (Dingodile)
Crash Bandicoot 4: It's About Time (Dingodile)

Dubbing roles

Live-action
After Earth (Commander Velan (Glenn Morshower))
Aquaman (King Atlan (Graham McTavish))
Childhood's End (Karellen (Charles Dance))
Damages (Phil Gray (Michael Nouri))
Existenz (The Seminar Leader (Christopher Eccleston))
Gifted (Greg Cullen (Glenn Plummer))
Gone Baby Gone (Detective Nick Poole (John Ashton))
Ground Control (2008 DVD edition) (T.C. Bryant (Bruce McGill))
Infernal Affairs III (Wong Chi-shing (Anthony Wong))
Infestation (Albert (Wesley Thompson))
Kit Kittredge: An American Girl (Mr. Jefferson Jasper Rene Berk (Stanley Tucci))
Kong: Skull Island (Hank Marlow (John C. Reilly))
The Last Time (Leguzza (Michael Lerner))
The Marine 2 (Damo (Temuera Morrison))
Music and Lyrics (Chris Riley (Brad Garrett))
The Newton Boys (Dock Newton (Vincent D'Onofrio))
No Time to Die (Felix Leiter (Jeffrey Wright))
North Face (2020 BS Tokyo edition) (Emil Landauer (Erwin Steinhauer))
Oldboy (No Joo-hwan (Ji Dae-han))
The Returned (Jérôme Séguret (Frédéric Pierrot))
Roswell (Kivar (Spence Decker))
The Salvation (Delarue (Jeffrey Dean Morgan))
Saving Private Ryan (2002 TV Asahi edition) (Technical Sergeant Michael Horvath (Tom Sizemore))
Scenes from a Marriage (Peter (Corey Stoll))
Spider-Man (Wrestling promoter (Larry Joshua))
Spider-Man 3 (Sandman (Thomas Haden Church))
Snatch (Abraham "Cousin Abe" Denovitz (Dennis Farina))
Transamerica (Calvin Many Goats (Graham Greene))
Without a Trace ("The Line") (Bear (Larry Joshua))

Animation
Arthur Christmas (Malcolm "Santa" Claus)

References

External links
Official agency profile 

1955 births
Living people
Japanese male stage actors
Japanese male video game actors
Japanese male voice actors
Male voice actors from Kanagawa Prefecture
Waseda University alumni
20th-century Japanese male actors
21st-century Japanese male actors